Jakob Schenk (31 March 1921 – 22 April 1951) was a Swiss cyclist. He competed in the individual and team road race events at the 1948 Summer Olympics. He also rode in the 1949 Giro d'Italia, but did not finish.

References

External links
 

1921 births
1951 deaths
Swiss male cyclists
Olympic cyclists of Switzerland
Cyclists at the 1948 Summer Olympics
Cyclists from Zürich